Raymond Reiter  (June 12, 1939 – September 16, 2002) was a Canadian computer scientist and logician. He  was one of the founders of the field of non-monotonic reasoning with his work on default logic, model-based diagnosis, closed world reasoning, and truth maintenance systems. He also contributed to the situation calculus.

Awards and honors
He was a Fellow of the Association for Computing Machinery (ACM), an AAAI Fellow, and a Fellow of the Royal Society of Canada. He won the IJCAI Award for Research Excellence in 1993.

Publications

 R. Reiter (1978). On closed world data bases. In H. Gallaire and J. Minker, editors, Logic and Data Bases, pages 119–140. Plenum., New York.
 R. Reiter (1980). A logic for default reasoning. Artificial Intelligence, 13:81-132.
 R. Reiter (1987). A theory of diagnosis from first principles. Artificial Intelligence, 32:57-95.
 R. Reiter (1991). The frame problem in the situation calculus: a simple solution (sometimes) and a completeness result for goal regression. In Vladimir Lifschitz, editor, Artificial Intelligence and Mathematical Theory of Computation: Papers in Honor of John McCarthy, pages 359–380. Academic Press, New York.
 R. Reiter (2001) Knowledge in Action: Logical Foundations for Specifying and Implementing Dynamical Systems  (448 pp.).  The MIT Press, Cambridge, Massachusetts and London, England.
 R. Reiter and J. de Kleer (1987). Foundations of assumption-based truth maintenance systems: Preliminary report. In Proceedings of the Sixth National Conference on Artificial Intelligence (AAAI'87), pages 183–188.
 H. Levesque, F. Pirri, and R. Reiter (1998). Foundations for the situation calculus Electronic Transactions on Artificial Intelligence, 2(3–4):159-178.
 F. Pirri and R. Reiter (1999). Some contributions to the metatheory of the Situation Calculus Journal of the ACM, 46(3):325–361.

References

Artificial intelligence researchers
Canadian computer scientists
Fellows of the Association for the Advancement of Artificial Intelligence
Fellows of the Association for Computing Machinery
Fellows of the Royal Society of Canada
1939 births
2002 deaths
University of Michigan alumni